Zuloagaea ('panic grass') is a monotypic genus of the central American plants in the grass family.
It only contains one known species, Zuloagaea bulbosa  It was formerly known as Panicum bulbosum 

It is native to United States of America (within the states of Arizona, New Mexico, Texas and Utah) and also central America (within the countries of Colombia, Ecuador, Guatemala, Honduras, Mexico and Nicaragua).

The genus was circumscribed by Emilie C. Bess in Systematic Botany vol.31 on page 666 in 2006.

The genus name of Zuloagaea is in honour of Fernando Omar Zuloaga (b.1951), an Argentinian botanist and Professor of Phytogeography from the National University of La Plata. He was between 1991 - 1998 curator and director of the Instituto de Botánica Darwinion.  

The genus and species is recognized by the United States Department of Agriculture and the Agricultural Research Service, since 29 December 2006.

References

Panicoideae
Grasses of the United States
Grasses of Mexico
Flora of Arizona
Flora of Utah
Flora of the South-Central United States
Flora of Mexico
Flora of Central America
Flora of Colombia
Monotypic Poaceae genera